The Orto Botanico del Mediterraneo is a botanical garden located on the grounds of the Museo di storia naturale del Mediterraneo at Livorno, Tuscany, Italy. It contains groupings of plants typical to various locations along the Mediterranean Sea, with each group in a specific soil (limestone, serpentine, volcanic, etc.).

See also 
 List of botanical gardens in Italy
 Giardino Botanico Mediterraneo (Abruzzo)

External links 
 Orto Botanico del Mediterraneo
 Orto Botanico d'Italia

Mediterraneo
Buildings and structures in Livorno
Gardens in Tuscany